Events in the year 1972 in Afghanistan.

Incumbents 
 Monarch - Mohammed Zahir Shah
 Prime Minister - Abdul Zahir (until November 12), Mohammad Musa Shafiq (starting November 19)

Domestic politics are overshadowed by economic hardship resulting from the worst drought the country has ever experienced. The lack of rain over large areas in 1971 has decimated the sheep population, which constitute the principal source of protein for a meat-eating nation; food crops also suffered severely. The year 1972 brings little relief, and the flow of people into Pakistan and Iran in quest of food continues. Both these countries again respond generously to the government's appeal for external assistance, and later in the year UN agencies give substantial help. Even so, by the fall the situation in some provinces, particularly Ghor, becomes desperate. Some 50,000-100,000 people, many of them women and children, face starvation. At this juncture, the UN Children's Emergency Fund rushes food, medicine, and clothing to the distressed area, and many people who would otherwise have perished are kept alive. The king and his government work tirelessly to overcome the national emergency, but the country's resources are still limited, communication with many outlying regions is not easy, and effective relief work is handicapped by local traditions of autonomy. One bright spot is the growing importance of the tourist industry. Foreign travelers naturally follow the excellent roads, constructed mainly with Soviet and U.S. help, that link the major cities, and are little tempted to go beyond the direct overland route from Europe to India and Nepal, in which Afghanistan is an essential link. Thus they are little affected by the distress in the outlying areas, and the foreign exchange that they bring into the country proves invaluable to the government. In foreign affairs Afghanistan's traditional policy of neutrality is strictly observed, and relations with all its neighbours remain friendly. No attempt is made to take advantage of Pakistan's difficulties, but, at the same time, economic and cultural contacts with India continue.

December 1972
After a massive vote of no confidence in the lower house of parliament, King Zahir Shah accepts the resignation of the government of Abdul Zahir, which had come under severe criticism for its alleged failure to cope with the emergency. The king appoints Mohammad Musa Shafiq to form a new administration which takes office later in the month. Shafiq had been prominent in shaping the constitution of 1964, which banned members of the royal family from public office, and had thereby brought to an end the quasi-dictatorship of Gen. Sardar Mohammad Daud Khan, the king's cousin and brother-in-law, who had virtually ruled Afghanistan from 1953 to 1963. The new prime minister sets to work to deal with the economic crisis, mobilizing young officials, students, and army officers into a relief corps to distribute the foreign aid that pours into the country from the U.S. and from international agencies. Even so, it is estimated that approximately 80,000 people have died of starvation before supplies could reach them.

 
Afghanistan
Years of the 20th century in Afghanistan
Afghanistan
1970s in Afghanistan